WMAO may refer to:

 WMAO-FM, a radio station (90.9 FM) licensed to Greenwood, Mississippi, United States
 WMAO-TV, a television station (channel 23) licensed to Greenwood, Mississippi, United States